Acinula is a monotypic genus of fungus with unknown classification. The only species is Acinula candicans.

The species was described by Elias Magnus Fries in 1822.

References

Ascomycota enigmatic taxa
Monotypic Ascomycota genera